Probability distribution function may refer to:
 Probability distribution
 Cumulative distribution function
 Probability mass function
 Probability density function